Paria (possibly from Quechua for reddish, copper or sparrow,) is a  mountain in the northern part of the Huayhuash mountain range in the Andes of Peru. It is located in the Ancash Region, Bolognesi Province, Pacllón District, and in the Huánuco Region, Lauricocha Province, Queropalca District. Paria lies northwest of Mitococha and south of Gasha.

References

Mountains of Peru
Mountains of Ancash Region
Mountains of Huánuco Region